Abbas Alilu (also Romanized as ‘Abbās ‘Alīlū) is a village in Angut-e Sharqi Rural District, Anguti District, Germi County, Ardabil Province, Iran. At the 2006 census, its population was 369, in 81 families.

References 

Towns and villages in Germi County